Perry–Lecompton USD 343 (Officially Perry Public Schools - USD 343) is a unified school district serving portions of southern Jefferson County and northwestern Douglas County.  It serves the communities of Perry, Lecompton, Grantville, and Williamstown.

Schools
The district has four school buildings and five schools.  
 Perry Elementary School serves grades K-2.
 Lecompton Elementary School serves grades 3-4.
 Perry-Lecompton Middle School, located in Perry, serves grades 5-8 and is part of the PLHS Building.
Perry-Lecompton High School, located in Perry, serves grades 9-12.  
The district also operates an Early Childhood Education Center in Grantville.

The district used to own and operate a school in Williamstown that served a variety of grades, but closed it down and sold it due to money constraints. The school in Williamstown is now used by the Williamstown Assembly of God.

References

External links
 Perry-Lecompton USD 343

School districts in Kansas
Education in Jefferson County, Kansas
Education in Douglas County, Kansas